Irma Cuevas (born 1976) is a Paraguayan footballer who plays forward for Paraguayan club Guaraní and who has played with the Paraguay women's national team.  She is one of the longest active players who have played in Paraguay's first women's tournament.

Premiere division career
Cuevas began playing for Nacional before moving to Guaraní.  She has scored more than 600 goals.  In 2017 she was the country's all-time top goal scorer.

International career
Cuevas represented Paraguay in the South American Women's Football Championship in 1998 and 2006.

International goals
Scores and results list Paraguay's goal tally first

References

1976 births
Living people
Paraguayan women's footballers
Women's association football forwards
Club Guaraní players
Paraguay women's international footballers
21st-century Paraguayan women
20th-century Paraguayan women